Tackle may refer to:

 In football:
 Tackle (football move), a play in various forms of football
 Tackle (gridiron football position), a position in American football and Canadian football
 Dump tackle, a forceful move in rugby of picking up an opposing player and throwing them to the ground
 The Tackle, a term for the final play of Super Bowl XXXIV
 Sliding tackle, a tackle in association football
 Fishing tackle, the gear or equipment used when fishing
 An assembly of pulleys with a rope threaded through them; see block and tackle
 Tackle (Transformers), a fictional character